The Agency for Public Management and eGovernment or Difi is a government agency subordinate to the Norwegian Ministry of Government Administration and Reform.

Responsibilities
It is responsible for help the public sector achieve quality, efficiency, user friendliness, openness and participation, as well as helping the public sector be organized and led in a good way with good intersectoral cooperation. It provides management consulting for the public sector and operates several websites on behalf of the Government.

History
The agency was created on January 1, 2008 and is based in Oslo and Leikanger. It was created after a merger of Statskonsult, the Norwegian eProcurement Secretariat and Norge.no.

Director from the start was Hans Christian Holte. He left the position in summer 2013 to become director of the Norwegian Tax Administration. Utheim, Midtsjø (30 October 2013) Ingelin Killengreen was hired as interim director with start December 2013.

References

Government agencies of Norway
Government agencies established in 2008
Organisations based in Oslo